Great Expectations is a British television series which first aired on the BBC 1 in 1967. It is an adaptation of the novel Great Expectations by Charles Dickens, which follows a humble orphan suddenly becoming a gentleman with the help of an unknown benefactor.

All episodes survived the BBC's routine junking and were released on DVD in 2017 by Simply Media.

Plot summary

Main cast
 Gary Bond as Pip
 Christopher Guard as young Pip
 Francesca Annis as Estella
 Maxine Audley as Miss Havisham
 Neil McCarthy as  Joe Gargery
 Richard O'Sullivan as Herbert Pocket
 Peter Vaughan as Mr. Jaggers
 Bernard Hepton as  Wemmick
 Norman Scace as  Pumblechook
 Hannah Gordon as  Biddy
 Shirley Cain as Mrs. Gargery
 Ronald Lacey as Orlick
 Elsie Wagstaff as Sarah Pocket
 Jon Laurimore as Bentley Drummle
 John Tate as Magwitch

One notable aspect of the production is Audley was only 43 when she played the old and decrepit Miss Havisham. Although this drew little to no attention at the time, Gillian Anderson, who was also a mere 43 when she played Havisham in the 2011 BBC adaptation, had some outlets calling attention to her casting in the role.

Critical reception
This adaptation has been positively received, and was hugely popular at the time of broadcast. "Even with so many different adaptations of Great Expectations jostling for position," Archive Television Musings wrote, "this 1967 serial – although it may lack the budget and scale of some of the others – is still worthy of attention.  Tightly scripted and well acted, it’s a very solid production which still stands up well today."

Archive status
The original master videotapes of the series were wiped during the BBC's archival clearing of older programmes throughout the 1970s. Although thought by some as lost for decades, all ten episodes survived as 16mm film copies which, most likely due to poor storage, suffer from a great vary in quality. Episodes 7 ("Pip's Benefactor") and 9 ("Retribution"), for example, are of the poorest quality, suffering from muffled sound, black lines on the top and bottom of the frame, and an overall lower image quality. Episodes such as 1 ("The Convict"), however, exist with high sound and picture quality, with only minor scratches and dirt on the film. As Simply Media did not have the budget required to put the films through restoration, all episodes are presented on the DVD with these physical shortcomings, with a disclaimer at the beginning of the DVD.

Earlier version
The BBC previously adapted Great Expectations as a 13-part serial in 1959 written by P.D. Cummins, starring Dinsdale Landen in his television debut as adult Pip. Although popular at the time (even being rebroadcast in 1960), it has since fallen into relative obscurity. It has never been fully released online or onto DVD as one of the episodes (Part Eight) is missing from the BBC Archives. Part One is available to view for free at the BFI Mediatheque service, and the other surviving episodes can be accessed by booking a screening session at their building on Stephen Street in London.

Other cast members include Colin Jeavons as adult Herbert Pocket, Michael Gwynn as Joe Gargery, Jerold Wells as Magwitch, Kenneth Thornett as Mr. Jaggers, Ronald Ibbs as Mr. Wemmick, Marjory Hawtrey as Miss Havisham, Richard Warner as Orlick, Helen Lindsay as adult Estella, Margot Van der Burgh as Mrs. Joe Gargery, Gabrielle Hamilton as Biddy, Nigel Davenport as Bentley Drummle, and Colin Spaull as young Pip.

References

Bibliography
 Ellen Baskin. Serials on British Television, 1950-1994. Scolar Press, 1996.

External links
 

BBC television dramas
1967 British television series debuts
1967 British television series endings
1960s British drama television series
English-language television shows
Television series set in the 19th century
Television shows based on Great Expectations
Television shows set in Kent